The first Conte government was the 65th government of the Italian Republic. It was led by Giuseppe Conte, an independent, and it was in office from 1 June 2018 to 5 September 2019.

The cabinet was formed by a coalition between the Five Star Movement and the League, but it also contained some independents proposed by each party (including the Prime Minister). It was referred to as the "government of change" after the name of the political agreement signed by the two parties, or the "yellow-green government", based on their customary colours, even if the League originally preferred "yellow-blue government", due to its new campaign colour under Salvini's leadership.

The government has often been described as "populist" (the first of that kind in Europe according to several sources) and its policies (and more specifically those of the League) have been described by Italian newspapers as "souverainist".

Supporting parties 
The government is supported and most of its members are provided by the two following parties.

At its birth, the government was also supported by the Associative Movement Italians Abroad (MAIE), five deputies and two senators previously expelled from the M5S, one dissident senator from the South American Union Italian Emigrants (USEI) who later joined the MAIE and one deputy of Forza Italia (FI) who sarcastically voted in favour of it. Ricardo Merlo, the leader of MAIE, was also named Undersecretary to the Ministry of Foreign Affairs on 12 June 2018. The government is also supported by the National Movement for Sovereignty, the Sardinian Action Party and the Italian Liberal Party (whose senators sit in the League group).

Brothers of Italy (FdI), the parties representing linguistic minorities (Valdostan Union, South Tyrolean People's Party and Trentino Tyrolean Autonomist Party) and one deputy from USEI do not support the government, but affirmed their willingness to vote for measures that reflect their respective ideologies.

History

Background and formation 

The March 2018 general election resulted in a hung parliament. The Five Star Movement (M5S) led by Luigi Di Maio resulted as the party with the largest number of votes and parliamentary seats, whereas the centre-right coalition in which Matteo Salvini's League emerged as the main political force won a plurality of seats both in the Chamber of Deputies and in the Senate. The centre-left coalition, built around the Democratic Party (PD) led by former Prime Minister Matteo Renzi, came third.

On 9 May, after weeks of political deadlock and failing attempts to form a cabinet, including possible M5S–Centre-right and M5S–PD coalitions, Di Maio and Salvini officially requested President Sergio Mattarella to concede them 24 hours more to strike a government agreement between their two parties. In the evening, Silvio Berlusconi publicly announced that Forza Italia (FI) would not support a M5S–League government on a vote of confidence, but it would still maintain the centre-right alliance nonetheless, thus opening the door to a possible majority government between the two parties.

On 13 May, the M5S and the League reached an agreement on a government program, however they did not find an agreement regarding their proposal for the Prime Minister and the Ministers. M5S and League leaders met with President Mattarella on 14 May and asked for an additional week of negotiations. Both parties announced they would ask their respective members to vote on the government agreement by the following weekend.

On 21 May, private law professor and M5S advisor Giuseppe Conte was proposed by Di Maio and Salvini for the role of Prime Minister. Despite reports in the media suggesting that President Mattarella had significant reservations about the direction of the new government, Conte was invited at the Quirinal Palace to receive the presidential mandate to form a new cabinet on 23 May. In his statement after the appointment, Conte said that he would be the "defense attorney of Italian people". The next day, Conte held talks with all the parliamentary parties, but the government formation was soon stuck on the appointment of Paolo Savona as Minister of Economy and Finance, which was unfavoured by President Mattarella, who considered his alleged support for Italy's covert exit from the Euro as an overwhelming risk for the country's economy. On 27 May, President Mattarella refused to appoint Savona, and Conte renounced his task after days of negotiation and an ultimatum by the two party leaders on Savona's nomination.

On 28 May, President Mattarella summoned Carlo Cottarelli (a former director of the International Monetary Fund) and gave him the task to form a new government. On the same day, the PD announced that it would abstain from voting the confidence to Cottarelli while the M5S, the League, FI and the Brothers of Italy (FdI) announced that they would have voted against. Cottarelli was expected to submit his list of ministers for approval to President Mattarella on 29 May. However, he held only informal consultations with the President on 29 and 30 May, awaiting the possible formation of a "political government". Meanwhile, Di Maio and Salvini announced their willingness to restart negotiations to form a "political" government and Giorgia Meloni (FdI leader) gave them her support.

On 31 May, the M5S and the League announced their new agreement on a Conte-led government with Giovanni Tria as Minister of Economy and Finance and Savona as Minister of European Affairs. Subsequently, President Mattarella summoned for the second time Conte, who announced the list of ministers. On 1 June, Prime Minister Conte and his ministers took their oaths of office and were sworn in. On 5 June the Italian Senate approved the new government in a vote of confidence. On 6 June the government was confirmed following the vote of confidence in the Chamber of Deputies.

On 12 June, the cabinet appointed 6 deputy ministers and 39 undersecretaries. Of all these appointments, 25 were M5S members, 17 League members, two non-party independents and one member of the Associative Movement Italians Abroad (MAIE). The M5S received four deputy ministers while the League received two.

Investiture votes 
On 5 June 2018, the Conte I Cabinet was granted the confidence of the Senate by receiving 171 votes in favor and 117 votes against (25 senators abstained; 7 senators did not vote, among which 6 were absent). Senators for life Elena Cattaneo, Mario Monti and Liliana Segre abstained while senators for life Carlo Rubbia, Renzo Piano and Giorgio Napolitano did not vote. On 6 June 2018, the so-called Government of Change received the confidence of the Chamber of Deputies by receiving 350 votes in favor and 236 votes against (35 deputies abstained; 8 deputies did not vote, among which 5 were absent).

Resignation 

Conte announced his resignation on August 20, 2019, averting a no-confidence vote promoted by Matteo Salvini. The same day, President of Italy Sergio Mattarella accepted Conte's resignation and announced consultations with party leaders for the next two days. On August 22, Mattarella said some parties were trying to form "a solid majority" and he gave these political parties until August 27 to report back to him, after which he would hold two more days of consultations.

On August 29, Mattarella tasked Conte with the formation of a new cabinet, a coalition of Five Star Movement and Democratic Party. As customary, the premier-designate reserved the right to accept the mandate, pending further talks with both parties.

Party breakdown

Beginning of term

Ministers

Ministers and other members 
 Five Star Movement (M5S): 8 ministers, 4 deputy ministers, 21 undersecretaries
 League (Lega): 5 ministers, 3 deputy ministers, 15 undersecretaries
 Associative Movement Italians Abroad (MAIE): 1 undersecretary
 Independents: Prime minister, 5 ministers, 2 undersecretaries

End of term

Ministers

Ministers and other members 
 Five Star Movement (M5S): 8 ministers, 4 deputy ministers, 21 undersecretaries
 League (Lega): 6 ministers, 3 deputy ministers, 15 undersecretaries
 Associative Movement Italians Abroad (MAIE): 1 undersecretary
 Independents: Prime minister, 4 ministers, 2 undersecretaries

Geographical breakdown

Beginning of term 
 Northern Italy: 9 ministers
Lombardy: 6 ministers
 Veneto: 3 ministers
 Central Italy: 2 ministers
 Lazio: 2 ministers
 Southern and Insular Italy: 8 ministers (including Conte)
 Sicily:  3 ministers
 Apulia: 2 ministers (including Conte)
 Campania: 2 ministers
 Sardinia: 1 minister

End of term 
 Northern Italy: 10 ministers
Lombardy: 7 ministers
 Veneto: 3 ministers
 Central Italy: 2 ministers
 Lazio: 2 ministers
 Southern and Insular Italy: 7 ministers (including Conte)
 Sicily:  3 ministers
 Apulia: 2 ministers (including Conte)
 Campania: 2 ministers

Council of Ministers

Composition

Program 
The two parties signed a contract on a shared program on various measures. During his speech before the investiture vote in the Italian Senate on 5 June, Conte announced his willingness to reduce illegal immigration and increase the contrast to human traffickers and smugglers. He also advocated a fight against political corruption, the introduction of a law which regulates the conflict of interests, a new bill which expands the right of self-defense, a tax reduction and a drastic cut to politics' costs, thanks to the annuities' abolition. Conte also proposed to lift off the international sanctions against Russia.

Immigration 
The coalition's immigration policy is led by Interior Minister and Deputy Prime Minister Matteo Salvini, a strong opponent of illegal immigration. Salvini laid out a three-point  program to contrast illegal immigration, including increasing the number of repatriation centers, reducing immigration and increasing deportations of those who don't qualify for asylum. The policy document calls for the deportation of Italy's estimated 500,000 undocumented immigrants "as a priority".

On 10 June 2018, Salvini announced the closure of Italian ports, stating that "everyone in Europe is doing their own business, now Italy is also raising its head. Let's stop the business of illegal immigration". The following day, the ships Aquarius and SOS Méditerranée that were requesting to dock at an Italian port to disembark the rescued migrants were turned away by Italy and Malta. On the following day, Spain accepted the passengers of the Aquarius.

On 18 June 2018, Salvini announced the government would conduct a census of Romani people in Italy for the purpose of deporting all who are not in the country legally. However, this measure was criticized as unconstitutional and was attacked by the opposition and also by some members of the M5S.

Taxes 
The Government of Change pledged to reform the Italian tax system by introducing flat taxes for businesses and individuals, with a no-tax area for low-income households and corrections to keep some degree of tax progression (as required by the Constitution).

Politicians salaries and pensions 
The parties intend to cut the pensions and annuities of members of the Parliament, regional councillors and those employed by constitutional bodies. They also intend to review all monthly pensions exceeding the amount contributed while working by more than 5,000 euros.

Direct democracy 
The coalition has pledged to use direct democracy via referendum. Riccardo Fraccaro, a M5S long time advocate of such votes, became the world's first Minister for Direct Democracy, advocating a lowering of the 50% participation quorum for referendum to be valid and the introduction of citizens' initiatives for new laws.

Public health 
The parties have pledged to reform the public health system to minimize inefficiencies and wastefulness of resources. The government contract features the digitalization of the public health system, enhanced transparency, improved governance in the pharmaceutical sector, centralization of purchases, fight against corruption, new procedures for the accreditation of private clinics, implementation of tele-medicine and improvement of home care. The parties envisioned a health system mostly supported by the fiscal system, with minimal contribution from the patients. They also pledged to reduce the waiting times for a specialist visit or for emergency care in public hospitals.

Public water 
The parties intend to practically implement the result of the 2011 referendum on public water, which resulted in the repeal of the law allowing the privatization of water services. The parties pledged to guarantee the quality of public water in all the municipalities by improving the water transport network, minimizing the leaks and replacing old pipelines that may still contain asbestos and lead.

Agriculture, fishing and Made in Italy 
The coalition intends to promote a reform of the Common Agricultural Policy of the European Union in a way that supports the Italian agriculture, but at the same time protects landscape and water resources and guarantees food safety. Small-scale agriculture and fishing should also be protected and the typical and traditional local productions should be safeguarded. Furthermore, the parties intend to promote the national productions within the trading treaties between the European Union and other countries and to protect the Made in Italy brand through proper labeling.

Environment, green economy and circular economy 
The parties pledged to increase the public awareness about environmental issues and enforce measures of prevention and maintenance of the environment in order to mitigate the risk related to landslides, hydrogeology and floods. They also plan to devote special attention to the issues raised by climate change and pollution. They intend to promote a green economy and support research, innovation and training for ecology-related employment to increase the competitiveness and sustainability of the industry and reduce the dependence on fossil fuels. They also intend to promote a circular economy for a sustainable waste management based on enhanced recycling and regeneration. Finally, the parties plan to arrest land consumption through strategies of urban renewal, retrofit of private and public buildings and infrastructure, with increase of energy efficiency and the promotion of distributed energy generation.

References

External links 

 
2018 establishments in Italy
Italian governments
Cabinets established in 2018
Giuseppe Conte